The Boxer Codex is a late-16th-century Spanish manuscript produced in the Philippines. It contains 75 colored illustrations of the peoples of China, the Philippines, Java, the Moluccas, the Ladrones, and Siam. About 270 pages of Spanish text describe these places, their inhabitants and customs. An additional 88 smaller drawings show mythological deities and demons, and both real and mythological birds and animals copied from popular Chinese texts and books in circulation at the time.

The English historian Charles Ralph Boxer purchased the manuscript in 1947 from the collection of Lord Ilchester in London. Boxer recognized the importance of what he called the "Manila Manuscript" and published a paper in 1950 with a detailed description of the codex. He made the manuscript freely available to other researchers for study, and it became known as the Boxer Codex. Boxer eventually sold it to Indiana University, where it is held by the Lilly Library.



Description and contents
The manuscript was written circa 1590 and contains illustrations of ethnic groups in the Philippines, across Southeast Asia, and in East Asia and Micronesia at the time of early Spanish contact. It also contains Taoist mythological deities and demons, and both real and mythological birds and animals copied from popular Chinese texts and books in circulation at the time. Aside from a description of and historical allusions to what is now the Philippines and various other Far Eastern countries, the codex also contains 97 hand-drawn color paintings and illustrations depicting peoples, birds and animals (both real and mythological) of the Philippines, the Indonesian Archipelago, Japan, Taiwan, China and mainland Southeast Asia. The first illustration is an oblong fold-out, 74 are full-page colored illustrations and the remaining are arranged four to a page on 22 pages (with some of the quarters remaining blank). Most of the drawings appear to have been copied or adapted from materials brought to the Philippines from China by Martin de Rada: the Shānhǎi Jīng (山海经, The Classic of Mountains and Seas), and books from the shenmo (神魔) genre, which depict deities and demons. The remaining drawings represent individuals, often a male and female pair, as inhabitants from tributaries of China and Taiwan with their distinctive costume; some of these have been refashioned as warriors. The depictions of inhabitants from Chinese tributaries may have been copied from a preexisting source, drawn from memory or perhaps even drawn according to instruction given by Rada or one of the other Europeans who visited China. At least 15 illustrations deal with the inhabitants of the Philippine Archipelago.

History and provenance
The Boxer Codex does not bear any direct statement of authorship or dates of production and there is no dedication that might indicate who was the patron of the work or for whom the work was intended. Its contents indicate that it was written in Manila in the early 1590s. The manuscript was likely compiled at the direction of Gómez Pérez Dasmariñas, the Spanish Governor-General of the Philippines, or his son, Luis Pérez Dasmariñas.

The Boxer Codex depicts the Tagalogs, Visayans, Zambals, Cagayanes or possibly Ibanags, and Negritos of the Philippines in vivid color. The paintings' technique and the use of Chinese paper, ink, and paints suggests that the artist may have been Chinese.

It is believed that the original owner of the manuscript was Luis Pérez Dasmariñas, son of Governor General Gómez Pérez Dasmariñas, the Spanish Governor-General of the Philippines. Luis succeeded his father in office as governor-general. Since Spanish colonial governors kept extensive written reports of the territories they governed, it is likely that the manuscript was written on the governor's orders.

The manuscript's earliest known modern owner was Lord Ilchester. The codex was among what remained in his collection when his estate, Holland House in London, was bombed on September 27, 1940, during the Blitz. It was auctioned in 1947 and came into the possession of Charles Ralph Boxer, an authority on the Far East, and whom it is named. It is now owned by the Lilly Library at Indiana University.

Picture gallery of the illustrations in Boxer Codex

Natives of the Philippines
(All Captions Below Based on Source)

Foreigners present in the Philippines 
(All Captions Below Based on Source)

See also

 Códice Casanatense
 José Honorato Lozano
 Damián Domingo
 Juan Luna
 Fernando Amorsolo
 Fabián de la Rosa
 Tipos del Pais

Notes

References

External links

Record and manuscript of the Boxer Codex at Indiana University

Primary sources for early Philippine history
Primary sources on Philippine history in the 16th century
History of the Philippines (900–1565)
History of the Philippines (1565–1898)
1590s books
Filipino nobility
Lilly Library